Naked II is the second live acoustic album and fifth live overall album by Dutch hard rock band Golden Earring, released in 1997 (see 1997 in music). The album was not issued in the U.S.

Track listing
All songs written by Hay and Kooymans except where noted.

"Who Do You Love?" (Ellas McDaniel) – 3:22
"Buddy Joe" (Kooymans) – 2:21
"She Flies on Strange Wings" (Kooymans) – 6:11
"Quiet Eyes" – 3:53
"Going to the Run" – 3:54
"Bombay" – 3:41
"Burning Stuntman" – 4:09[Studio Recording]
"Mood Indigo" – 4:13[Studio Recording]
"Where Will I Be" (Kooymans) – 4:06
"This Wheel's on Fire" (Rick Danko, Bob Dylan) – 3:15
"Johnny Make Believe" – 4:40
"When the Lady Smiles" – 5:21
"The Devil Made Me Do It" – 7:18

Personnel
Rinus Gerritsen – bass
Barry Hay – guitar, vocals
George Kooymans – guitar, vocals
Cesar Zuiderwijk – drums

Additional personnel
John Sonneveld – producer, engineer
Cicero Vonnegun – keyboard

Charts

Weekly charts

Year-end charts

Certifications

References

Golden Earring live albums
1997 live albums